Sasso d'Ombrone is a village in Tuscany, central Italy, administratively a frazione of the comune of Cinigiano, province of Grosseto. At the time of the 2001 census its population amounted to 300.

Sasso d'Ombrone is about 33 km from Grosseto and 8 km from Cinigiano, and it is situated along the road which links Cinigiano to the Cipressino Provincial Road at Paganico, on a hill in the valley of Ombrone.

History 
Formerly known as Sasso di Maremma, the village was born in the 13th century as a castle of the Aldobrandeschi. It was then held by the Ardengheschi and conquered by the Republic of Siena in the 15th century.

Main sights 
 Church of San Michele Arcangelo (13th century), main parish church of the village, it was re-built in the 16th century and then in the early 19th century.
 Sanctuary of Madonna del Soccorso (16th century), it was entirely re-built in 1872.
 Castle of Sasso (13th century), it's now in ruins.

References

Bibliography 
  Emanuele Repetti, «Sasso d'Ombrone», Dizionario Geografico Fisico Storico della Toscana, 1833–1846.
 Bruno Santi, Guida storico-artistica alla Maremma. Itinerari culturali nella provincia di Grosseto, Siena, Nuova Immagine, 1995, p. 178-179.
 Aldo Mazzolai, Guida della Maremma. Percorsi tra arte e natura, Florence, Le Lettere, 1997.
 Giuseppe Guerrini, Torri e castelli della provincia di Grosseto, Siena, Nuova Immagine, 1999.

See also 
 Borgo Santa Rita
 Castiglioncello Bandini
 Monticello Amiata
 Poggi del Sasso
 Porrona

Frazioni of Cinigiano